Steven Gillespie (born 4 June 1985) is an English retired footballer who played as a striker.

Career

Early career
Born in Liverpool, Merseyside, Gillespie began his career as a trainee for Liverpool.

Gillespie began his career with Liverpool having carved out a name for himself as a goalscorer in schoolboy football. He broke Robbie Fowler's goal-scoring record for Liverpool Schools; he later had his record broken by Wayne Rooney.

Bristol City
In 2004, having had few opportunities at Liverpool, he was released and was quickly signed by Bristol City, of League One.

Cheltenham Town
He continued to find himself without many chances and later in 2004 was sent on-loan to Cheltenham Town of League Two, where he scored four goals in five appearances. Gillespie once again joined Cheltenham on loan at the end of the 2004–05 season, and again in the first half of the 2005–2006 season, scoring a further five goals. He signed a permanent two-and-a-half-year contract in January 2006, for an undisclosed fee.

Despite signing a new contract in August 2007, Gillespie handed in a transfer request in the summer of 2008 after having an impressive season with Cheltenham as they finished in mid-table in League One. Less than a week after handing in the request, Gillespie was sold to fellow League One club Colchester United for a fee of £400,000.

Colchester United
On 7 July 2008, Gillespie signed for Colchester following a successful season with Cheltenham in which he scored 16 goals. It was a club record signing, as the U's looked to bounce back to the Championship.

Unfortunately for both Gillespie and Colchester, however, his time with the club was dogged by injuries from shortly after his arrival, despite having made a promising start with three goals from his first three outings.

His first season in Essex continued to be stop-start and, although when he managed to play he continued to show his natural, goalscoring instinct and displayed this in scoring five goals in his little time spent on the pitch, he struggled to rack up game time and barely managed a ninety-minute performance. This was compounded when, in the 5–0 home win over Carlisle he managed just sixteen minutes in his return from injury before having to go off injured once more.

The season was a huge shame for Gillespie who would have wished to make a much more impressive impact on his arrival as the club's record signing. Under Aidy Boothroyd in the 2009/10 season he struggled to break into the team despite seemingly having gotten over the worst of his injury troubles and it was not until the final season of his contract that Gillespie's ability finally came to the fore.

With John Ward now the U's manager, his former Cheltenham Town boss eased him back into the U's team after the Christmas period and Gillespie flourished, bagging nine goals in ten starts as well as having a legitimate goal chalked out in a 0–1 defeat at Charlton.

Gillespie committed his future to Colchester for another two years on 17 May 2011 and was given the number nine shirt for the 2011–12 season. During the campaign, he finished with 11 goals in League One, which was his best return in a football season for Colchester. He finished with 12 goals in all competitions.

Fleetwood Town
Gillespie signed for newly promoted League Two outfit Fleetwood Town on 18 June 2012. On 30 January 2014, Gillespie was released from Fleetwood Town.

Return to Cheltenham Town
Gillespie returned to Cheltenham Town on loan from Fleetwood on 15 August 2013, making his second debut for the club two days later in their 3–1 home defeat to Plymouth Argyle.

Bristol Rovers
On 6 February 2014, Gillespie joined up with John Ward again, following spells at Cheltenham Town and Colchester United. He scored his first goal for Rovers with an 88th-minute equaliser against Scunthorpe United after coming on as a 53rd minute substitution for the injured Alan Gow. He made his first start for the club 1 month later in a goalless draw with Southend United.

Altrincham
Gillespie joined newly promoted Conference Premier team Altrincham on 19 July 2014.

Skelmersdale United
Gillespie joined Northern Premier League team Skelmersdale United on loan on 12 February 2017. He made 11 appearances as well as being a part of the United coaching setup.

Career statistics

Honours
Cheltenham Town
Football League Two play-offs: 2005–06

References

External links

1985 births
Living people
Footballers from Liverpool
English footballers
Association football forwards
Liverpool F.C. players
Bristol City F.C. players
Cheltenham Town F.C. players
Colchester United F.C. players
Fleetwood Town F.C. players
Bristol Rovers F.C. players
Altrincham F.C. players
English Football League players
Warrington Town F.C. players
Skelmersdale United F.C. players